Pressure Cooker is a 2008 documentary film directed by Mark Becker and Jennifer Grausman.

Background
The film revolves around a teacher of a culinary course, Wilma Stephenson, who has been instrumental in leading her students in working-class Northeast Philadelphia to receive large scholarships for college. The film begins with Stephenson stating that, the year prior, 11 of her seniors has earned more than $750,000 in culinary scholarships. As the crew follows the students for the length of year, the students learn, expand their abilities, and compete in cutthroat competitions to earn enough in scholarships to pursue their dreams.

References

External links
Pressure Cooker official site

Documentary films about education in the United States
2008 films
2008 documentary films
Participant (company) films
Documentary films about Philadelphia
Education in Philadelphia
2000s English-language films